Vasantha Sena is a 1967 Telugu-language historical drama film, produced and directed by B. S. Ranga under the Vikram Studios banner. It stars Akkineni Nageswara Rao and Krishna Kumari, with music composed by S. Rajeswara Rao. The film is based on the Sanskrit Stage drama, Mṛcchakatika by Śūdraka of 5th century AD. It was Tamil actress, Padmini Ramachandran's last Telugu movie.

Plot
The film begins around 2000 years ago at Ujjain, Chaaru Datta (Akkineni Nageswara Rao) a renowned artist & well-respected person for his charities, despite impoverishing his wife Aditi (Anjali Devi) & son Rohasena (Baby Prasanti). Vasantha Sena (Krishna Kumari) an expert dancer & musician who protects her chastity though she is born in a courtesan family. Both of them acquainted, enamored and write a poem of romance. Parallelly, Ujjain is ruled by King Palaka who earmarks his lecherous brother-in-law Samsthanaka (S. V. Ranga Rao) as his representative. Samsthanaka keeps an evil eye on Vasantha Sena and aspires to possess her but she refuses. Eventually, anarchy arises in the kingdom due to the waywardness of King Palaka and a revolution is plotted by warrior Aryaka (Satyanarayana). Once Vasantha Sena entrusts her jewelry to Charu Datta for a future meeting which is stolen by a thief Sarvilaka (Relangi) to relieve his lover Madanika (Girija), the maid of Vasantha Sena from imprisonment. In spite of recognizing it, Vasantha Sena sets Madanika free. Here, Charu Datta presents a rare pearl necklace to Vasantha Sena which belongs to Aditi which is more valuable than stolen jewelry. Knowing it, Aditi leaves the house when Charu Datta's friend Maitreya (Balakrishna) warns him that his deeds may lead to catastrophic situations but he Keeps a deaf ear. Right now, Charu Datta accepts Vasantha Sena as his mistress and promises to send her a chariot. At that juncture, Samsthanaka ploys and misleads Vasantha Sena by sending his chariot where he tries to molest her. In that scramble, Samsthanaka assumes Vasantha Sena died when he clearly indicts Chaaru Datta and he is sentenced to death. Just before, Vasantha Sena revives, saves Charu Datta when Aditi also realizes her virtue and accepts her. Simultaneously, Aryaka dethrones Palaka by forming a new state and Samsthanaka is arrested. Thereafter, Aryaka accolades Charu Datta with an important position in his court. At last, Charu Datta pleads pardon from Aryaka on behalf of Samsthanaka showing his generosity. Finally, the movie ends on a happy note.

Cast
Akkineni Nageswara Rao as Chaaru Datta
Krishna Kumari as Vasantha Sena
S. V. Ranga Rao as Samsthanaka
Relangi as Sarvilaka
Satyanarayana as Aryaka
Balakrishna as Maitriya
Anjali Devi as Aditi
Girija as Madanika
Padmini as Anaga Sena
Savitha

Crew
Art: Vaali, Sudhidu Rai
Choreography: Heeralal, Chinni-Sampath, A. K. Chopra
Dialogues: Vempati Sadasivabrahmam
Lyrics: C. Narayana Reddy, Dasaradhi, Sri Sri, Kosaraju
Playback: Ghantasala, P. Susheela, S. Janaki, P. B. Sreenivas, Madhavapeddi Satyam, P. Leela, B. Vasantha, Swarnalata
Music: S. Rajeswara Rao
Editing: P. J. Mohan, M. Devendranath, T. Chakrapani
Cinematography: B. S. Ranga, B. S. Hayaas
Producer - Director: B. S. Ranga
Banner: Vikram Productions
Release Date: 12 August 1967

Soundtrack

Music composed by S. Rajeswara Rao. Music released on Audio Company.

References

Films scored by S. Rajeswara Rao
Films set in ancient India
1960s Telugu-language films
Indian films based on plays